"Baby Jump" is a popular song, released as a single in 1971 by Mungo Jerry.

Written by the group's lead vocalist and guitarist Ray Dorset and produced by Barry Murray, it was the band's second No. 1 single, reaching the top of the UK Singles Chart for two weeks in March 1971. The song originally entered at No. 32 before dropping out of the chart due to lack of sales data owing to a national postal strike, but re-entered two weeks later at No. 14. The song also reached No. 5 in the Irish Singles Chart.

Like the group's debut single, "In the Summertime", the British release was a maxi-single playing at 33 rpm. The second track on the A-side was a Paul King composition, "The Man Behind the Piano". The B-side, which had a playing time of 9 minutes 50 seconds, included live recordings from their Hollywood Festival appearance of "Maggie" (excerpt), "Midnight Special", and "Mighty Man".

References

1971 singles
UK Singles Chart number-one singles
Mungo Jerry songs
Songs written by Ray Dorset
1971 songs
Dawn Records singles
Song recordings produced by Barry Murray